Makeham is a surname. Notable people with the surname include:

Bob Makeham (1901–1974), Australian rules footballer
Eliot Makeham (1882–1956), English actor
William Makeham (1826–1891), English actuary and mathematician